The Women's Park of Borujerd ( pārke bānovāne borūjerd) is an urban park in the city of Borujerd, in the province of Lorestan, western Iran. Established in May 2001, according to Iran’s Cultural Heritage News Agency  (CHN), the Women’s park is the first park in Iran specifically designed for and dedicated to women in Iran.

This park is located in Shahrdari Blvd. and it was originally a garden and agricultural field in the city. It has more than 40,000 m2 area and is protected with five-meter-high walls to give women and girls opportunity to use the park freely without the formal Islamic hijab. The park is totally managed by women. Adult men are not allowed in.

References 

 Women's Park of Borujerd homepage

Parks in Iran
Buildings and structures in Lorestan Province
2001 establishments in Iran
Tourist attractions in Lorestan Province
Borujerd
Women in Iran